Valorant is a free-to-play first-person tactical hero shooter developed and published by Riot Games, for Windows. Teased under the codename Project A in October 2019, the game began a closed beta period with limited access on April 7, 2020, followed by a release on June 2, 2020. The development of the game started in 2014. Valorant takes inspiration from the Counter-Strike series of tactical shooters, borrowing several mechanics such as the buy menu, spray patterns, and inaccuracy while moving.

Gameplay
Valorant is a team-based first-person tactical hero shooter set in the near future. Players play as one of a set of Agents, characters based on several countries and cultures around the world. In the main game mode, players are assigned to either the attacking or defending team with each team having five players on it. Agents have unique abilities, each requiring charges, as well as a unique ultimate ability that requires charging through kills, deaths, orbs, or objectives. Every player starts each round with a "classic" pistol and one or more "signature ability" charges. Other weapons and ability charges can be purchased using an in-game economic system that awards money based on the outcome of the previous round, any kills the player is responsible for, and any objectives completed. The game has an assortment of weapons including secondary guns like sidearms and primary guns like submachine guns, shotguns, machine guns, assault rifles and sniper rifles. There are automatic and semi-automatic weapons that each have a unique shooting pattern that has to be controlled by the player to be able to shoot accurately. It currently offers 20 agents to choose from. They are Brimstone, Viper, Omen, Cypher, Sova, Sage, Phoenix, Jett, Raze, Breach, Reyna, Killjoy, Skye, Yoru, Astra, KAY/O, Chamber, Neon, Fade, Harbor, and Gekko. The player will get 5 unlocked agents when they create their account, (Brimstone, Sova, Sage, Phoenix and Jett) and will have to unlock the rest of the agents by activating that agent's contract.

Unrated
In the standard non-ranked mode, the match is played as best of 25 - the first team to win 13 rounds wins the match. The attacking team has a bomb-type device called the Spike. They must deliver and activate the Spike on one of the multiple specified locations (bomb sites). If the attacking team successfully protects the activated Spike for 45 seconds it detonates, destroying everything in a specific area, and they receive a point. If the defending team can deactivate the spike, or the 100-second round timer expires without the attacking team activating the spike, the defending team receives a point. If all the members of a team are eliminated before the spike is activated, or if all members of the defending team are eliminated after the spike is activated, the opposing team earns a point. If both teams win 12 rounds, sudden death occurs, in which the winning team of that round wins the match, differing from overtime for competitive matches. Additionally, if after 4 rounds, a team wishes to forfeit that match, they may request a vote to surrender. If the vote reaches 4 (in contrast to 5 for competitive), the winning team gets all the victory credit for every round needed to bring them to 13, with the forfeiting team receiving losing credit. A team gets only three chances to surrender: once in the first half, once in the pistol round of the second half, and once more in the second half.

Spike Rush
In the Spike Rush mode, the match is played as best of 7 rounds - the first team to win 4 rounds wins the match. Players begin the round with all abilities fully charged except their ultimate, which charges twice as fast as in standard games. All players on the attacking team carry a spike, but only one spike may be activated per round. Guns are randomized in every round and every player begins with the same gun. Ultimate point orbs in the standard game are present, as well as multiple different power-up orbs.

Swiftplay 
Swiftplay matches are simply a shortened version of the Unrated game mode. 10 players are split into 2 teams, attackers and defenders. Attackers must plant the spike while the Defenders must stop them. What differs Swiftplay to Unrated is that it is best to 9 rounds - the first team to win 5 rounds wins the match. On round 4, the team's players switch, as they would do in round 7 in the Unrated game mode. The game's currency system has no changes from Unrated. Swiftplay is meant as a quick game mode, averaging around 15 minutes per game, as opposed to around 40 minutes for Unrated.

Competitive
Competitive matches are the same as unranked matches with the addition of a win-based ranking system that assigns a rank to each player after 5 games are played. Players are required to reach level 20 before playing this mode. In July 2020, Riot introduced a "win by two" condition for competitive matches, where instead of playing a single sudden death round at 12-12, teams will alternate playing rounds on attack and defense in overtime until a team claims victory by securing a two-match lead. Each overtime round gives players the same amount of money to purchase guns and abilities, as well as approximately half of their ultimate ability charge. After each group of two rounds, players may vote to end the game in a draw, requiring 6 players after the first set, 3 after the second, and thereafter only 1 player to agree to a draw. The competitive ranking system ranges from Iron to Radiant. Every rank except for Radiant has 3 tiers. Radiant is reserved for the top 500 players of a region, and both Immortal and Radiant have a number associated to their rank allowing players to have a metric in which they can compare how they rank up to others at their level.

Premier 
Premier is a 5v5 gamemode that allows players a path-to-pro competitive game mode that is aimed towards players that wish to be a professional player. Premier is currently in alpha testing in Brazil. Players will need to create a team of five to compete against other teams in divisions. Each season will last a few weeks and the top teams will be invited to compete in the Division Championship. This gamemode will include a pick-and-ban system for maps unlike all the other gamemodes where the players have to play the map selected by the system.

Deathmatch
The Deathmatch mode was introduced on August 5, 2020. 14 players enter a 9-minute free-for-all match and the first person to reach 40 kills or the player who has the most kills when time is up wins the match. Players spawn in with a random agent as well as full shields, and all abilities are disabled during the match which indulges pure gunplay. Green health packs drop on every kill, which reset the player to maximum health, armor, and give an additional 30 bullets to each of their guns.

Escalation
The Escalation gamemode was introduced on February 17, 2021 and is similar to the "gungame" concept found in Counter-Strike and Call of Duty: Black Ops, though it is team-based rather than free-for-all with 5 players on each team. The game will pick a random selection of 12 weapons to move through. As with other gungame versions, a team needs to get a certain number of kills to advance to the next weapon and the weapons get progressively worse as the team moves through them. There are two winning conditions, if one team successfully goes through all 12 levels, or if one team is on a higher level than the opposing team within 10 minutes. Just like Deathmatch, players spawn in as a random agent, unable to use abilities, as the gamemode is set for pure gun fights. Though, abilities like Sova's shock darts, Raze's boom bot, and rocket launcher, are abilities that everyone gets to use as a weapon. After a kill, green health packs drop, which replenishes the player's health, armor, and ammo to its maximum. The gamemode also has auto respawns on, respawning players in random locations around the map.

Replication
The Replication gamemode went live on May 11, 2021. During the agent select, players vote on which agent they would want to play as. At the end of the time, or after everyone has voted, the game randomly selects one of the player's votes. The entire team will then play as that agent, even if one of the players has not unlocked that agent. It is a best of nine, with the players switching sides after the fourth round. Players can buy guns and shields with a pre-set number of credits. Abilities are pre-bought. Weapons and shields are reset every round.

Snowball Fight
Snowball Fight is a limited-time gamemode that was released on December 15, 2020, and is only available during Christmas season. It is a Team Deathmatch game mode, with 50 kills to win. Abilities are not allowed to be used, and players spawn in as a random agent. The only weapon available is the snowball launcher, which is an instant kill, but slow, and uses a projectile-based arc. There is infinite ammo. Throughout the game a "portal" will spawn, delivering gifts, which each contain a random power up.

Agents
There are a large variety of playable agents available in the game. Agents are divided into 4 roles: Duelists, Sentinels, Initiators, and Controllers. Each agent has a different role which indicates how the agent is usually played.

Duelist
Duelists specialize in attacking and entering a bomb site for the team. Riot's official definition for duelists is "self-sufficient fraggers." Duelists mainly create space for their team while entering onto a site, giving their teammates information, and making entering a site easier. Their abilities tend to consist of flashes which blind enemies, and movement-based abilities that allow for them to cover large distances faster than other agents. This type of ability kit allows for duelists to shine best when they are able to catch players off guard and get impact frags. On attack, duelists are most often expected to play forward, leading the attack. They are expected to be in front of everyone to get opening picks on enemies since their abilities often give them a competitive advantage when gunfighting an enemy. On defense, duelists will be holding choke points where enemies try to enter sites. Due to the mobility in their kits, they are able to get a pick and reposition, giving their team a numbers advantage. The Duelists are Jett, Neon, Pheonix, Raze, Reyna, and Yoru.

Sentinel
Sentinels are the defensive line, which specializes in locking down sites and protecting teammates from enemies. Their abilities mainly consist of static 'objects' that are obstacles to the enemies. These objects can give the team valuable information and/or deal damage. On attack, sentinels can use their abilities to cut off certain parts of the map or set up 'objects' that can ensure the enemy cannot flank without being noticed. On defense, sentinels can use their abilities to slow enemies from entering a site. This provides valuable time for the sentinels' team members to come and provide defensive support. The sentinels are Chamber, Cypher, Killjoy, and Sage.

Initiator
Initiators plan out the offensive pushes. Initiators specialize in breaking through defensive enemy positions. Initiators' abilities can consist of flashes but also abilities that can reveal the location of enemies. This information allows for attackers to know where enemies are and make taking a site easier. On defense, initiators can use their abilities to provide information on where the attackers are going, as well as helping their teammates retake a lost site. The initiators are Breach, Fade, Gekko, Kay-O, Skye, and Sova.

Controller
Controllers specialize in "slicing up dangerous territory to set their team up for success." They use their abilities to create coverage or clear out areas of space with crowd control. To help their team enter into enemy territory, their abilities consist of some kind of smoke, as well as molotovs, stuns, or flashes. With their smokes, controllers can control sightlines on the map, making it safer to move through the map without getting seen. On offense, controllers can smoke off certain sightlines and use their crowd control on common defensive spots to force enemies into the open. On defense, controllers can smoke and/or use crowd control on entryways to delay or discourage the enemy team from moving forward. The controllers are Astra, Brimstone, Harbor, Omen, and Viper.

Store
The store is composed of three sections: Featured, Offers, and Night Market. In all three sections, players can buy weapon skins using Valorant Points that change the appearance of their weapon in-game. Valorant Points (VP) is an in-game currency that can only be purchased with real currency within the game client.

Featured
The featured section of the store changes every two weeks. Most of the time, the featured section will have new skin releases (called "bundles") from Riot, giving players a limited opportunity to buy them without having to wait for them to appear in the offers section.

Offers
The offers section of the store gives players the ability to buy four randomly chosen unowned skins and the four skins change every 24 hours.

Night Market
Night Market is a periodic store that drops at random times in each Act of the game. The Night Market includes 6 random weapon skins at randomly discounted prices which is unique to every player. Players only receive one set of offers and the offer will last until the Night Market ends.

Development
Valorant was developed and published by Riot Games, the studio behind League of Legends. Development started in 2014, within their research and development division. Joe Ziegler, Valorant game director, is credited with the initial idea of Valorant while formulating potential games with other Riot developers. David Nottingham is the creative director for Valorant. Trevor Romleski, former League of Legends designer and Salvatore Garozzo, former professional player and map designer for Counter-Strike: Global Offensive are game designers for Valorant. Moby Francke, former Valve developer, who has been art and character designer for Half-Life 2 and Team Fortress 2, is the art director.

Valorant was developed with two main focuses: making tactical shooters and e-sports more accessible to new players, and creating a game that would attract a large competitive scene, while solving many of the points of criticism voiced by professional players from games in the genre. Games aimed at large, active communities and player bases, typically free-to-play games like Fortnite or Riot's own League of Legends, tend to put an emphasis on a wider array of system performance improvements and game stability rather than newer technologies or graphics as a way of making sure they're as accessible as possible. In interviews leading up to the game's launch, game director Joe Ziegler and producer Anna Donlon said that Valorant was made for people playing their first tactical shooter just as much as it was for professional players, and that accessibility of the game was a large priority.

Riot chose to develop Valorant using Unreal Engine 4, which the development team said would allow it to focus on gameplay and optimizations rather than spending time on core systems. To meet the goal of a lower performance barrier so more people could play Valorant, the team set notably low minimum and recommended hardware requirements for the game. To reach 30 frames per second on these small requirements, the game's engineering team, led by Marcus Reid, who previously worked on Gears of War 4, had to make several modifications to the engine. These modifications included editing the renderer using the engine's mobile rendering path as base, or reworking the game's lighting systems to fit the static lighting that tactical shooters often require, as to not interfere with gameplay. Unreal's modern underpinnings also helped to solve many of the issues that Riot set out to solve from other games in the genre, and additional modifications helped to meet the game's other goal of creating a suitable competitive environment, including optimizing server performance by disabling character animations in non-combat situations and removing unnecessary evaluations in the hit registration process. During development, Riot Games made promises to work towards a ping of less than 35 milliseconds for at least 70% of the game's players. To accomplish this, Riot promised 128-tick servers in or near most major cities in the world, as well as working with internet service providers to set up dedicated connections to those servers. Due to the increase in internet traffic during the COVID-19 pandemic, Riot has had trouble optimizing connections and ping to their promised levels.

Release
Valorant was teased under a tentative title Project A in October 2019. It was announced on March 1, 2020, with a gameplay video on YouTube called "The Round". The closed beta of the game was launched on April 7, 2020. For a chance to obtain a beta access key, players were required to sign up for accounts with both Riot Games and the streaming platform Twitch and watch related streams. This beta ended on May 28, 2020, with the game being fully released on June 2, 2020.

Reception

Valorant has been compared to Valve's Counter-Strike: Global Offensive, with both games having two teams of five attempting to plant a bomb, and Blizzard Entertainment's class-based shooter Overwatch, as both games have multiple classes and characters catering to various playstyles.

Austen Goslin of Polygon praised the beta of Valorant describing it as refined and "one of the most fun tactical shooters I've played". On the first day of its beta launch, Valorant amassed the second most concurrent viewers for any game ever on Twitch, with 1.73 million viewers tuning in across dozens of streams. Only another title from Riot Games, League of Legends, has had more concurrent viewers, when 1.74 million watched the 2019 World Championship final.

Valorant has received criticism for its toxic, male-dominated voice communication system. Emily Rand of ESPN talked about her negative experience playing on teams using the voice communication function as a female. Rand "flat-out [refuses] to use it at all" when she isn't playing with her friends. Jordon Oloman of The Guardian explains how "the bad apples among Valorants players expect an absurd level of perfection, and the resultant voice-chat criticism is hardly constructive."

Valorant was nominated for Best Esports Game, Best Multiplayer and Best Community Support at The Game Awards 2020. It won the Best Esports Game at The Game Awards 2022.

Valorant has also been criticized for its weapon skin's prices being exceptionally high, by the community.

Anti-cheat software
The game has been criticized for its anti-cheat software, Vanguard, as it was revealed to run on a kernel driver, which allows access to the computer system. OSNews expressed concern that Riot Games and its owner, Chinese technology conglomerate Tencent, could spy on players and that the kernel driver could be potentially exploited by third parties. However, Riot Games stated that the driver does not send any information back to them, and launched a bug bounty program to offer rewards for reports that demonstrate vulnerabilities with the software. The bounty will reward white hat hackers between $25,000 to $100,000 for reports on its vulnerabilities, with the pay being based on the severity of the exploit. Gameplay bugs do not qualify for this bounty.

Valorant will not run on Windows 11 if the system does not have a Trusted Platform Module (TPM) 2.0 compliant cryptoprocessor and UEFI secure boot enabled, as mandated by Microsoft's minimum system requirements for the operating system.

Esports

Valorant has become active within esports. Riot Games decided to create the first tournament called "First Strike" to establish a foundation for an esports scene to be created with the game. In November 2020, Riot Games announced the tournament series called Valorant Champions Tour (VCT) which is a year-long competition consisting of three levels:

 Valorant Challengers - regional competitions which are qualifiers for Masters
 Valorant Masters - international competitions in mid-season, divided into many stages
 Valorant Champions - the world championship of the year

Teams will qualify directly for Champions via top places in Circuit Point Standings of their region, based on results of Challengers and Masters. Teams who are at middle places in Circuit Point Standings will have one more chance to qualify for Champions by winning the Last Chance Qualifiers (North America, EMEA, South America, Asia Pacific).

The 2021 Valorant Champions was hosted in 1–12 December at Berlin. Acend defeated Gambit Esports on the score 3–2 in finals and became the first ever world champion of Valorant esports. 

The 2022 Valorant Champions was hosted from August 31-September 18 at Istanbul. LOUD defeated OpTic Gaming on the score 3–1 in finals and became the 2nd world champion of Valorant esports.

Mobile spin-off
On June 2, 2021, Riot Games announced its plans to develop a mobile version of Valorant, which would reportedly be the first step it intends to take to expand the game's universe. The announcement was made in commemoration of the game's first year, by which point it had reached over 14 million monthly active players since its launch.

References

External links
 

2020 video games
Valorant
Video games containing battle passes
Esports games
First-person shooter multiplayer online games
First-person shooters
Free-to-play video games
Unreal Engine games
Hero shooters
Video games developed in the United States
Windows games
Windows-only games
Tactical shooter video games
Riot Games games
Video games about bomb disposal
The Game Awards winners